BXI is a collaborative EP by the Japanese band Boris and the Cult lead vocalist Ian Astbury. The EP was released in September 2010 in CD, black, blue and pink vinyl, and digital formats through Southern Lord Records. Boris and Ian Astbury had performed live together, including on May 30, 2010, at the Sydney Opera House and on September 7, 2010, at the Brooklyn Masonic Temple in Brooklyn, New York.

Track listing

Personnel
Per the album liner notes.
Ian Astbury – vocals, lyrics
Takeshi – bass guitar, rhythm guitar
Wata – vocals, lead guitar
Atsuo – drums, percussion
Michio Kurihara – guitar on "Rain" and "Magickal Child"

Production and design
Tetsuya "Cherry" Tochigi – recording, mixing
"Fangsanalsatan" – recording, engineering
Soichiro Nakamura – mixing, mastering
Tadashi Hamada – artists and repertoire
André Fromont – Polaroid photography
Miki Matsushima – BXI photograph
Stephen O'Malley – design

References

2010 EPs
Boris (band) albums
Southern Lord Records albums
Collaborative albums